Iván Rodríguez Padilla (born 15 January 1937 in Yauco, Puerto Rico) is a Puerto Rican former sprinter who competed in the 1956 Summer Olympics and in the 1960 Summer Olympics. He finished third in the 1959 Pan American Games 4×400 metres Relay (with Ramón Vega, Frank Rivera, and the non-Olympian Cains). In the 1959 Pan American Games 400 metres Rodríguez finished fifth.

References

1937 births
Living people
People from Yauco, Puerto Rico
Puerto Rican male sprinters
Olympic track and field athletes of Puerto Rico
Athletes (track and field) at the 1956 Summer Olympics
Athletes (track and field) at the 1960 Summer Olympics
Pan American Games bronze medalists for Puerto Rico
Athletes (track and field) at the 1959 Pan American Games
Pan American Games medalists in athletics (track and field)
Central American and Caribbean Games gold medalists for Puerto Rico
Competitors at the 1959 Central American and Caribbean Games
Central American and Caribbean Games medalists in athletics
Medalists at the 1959 Pan American Games